Repps with Bastwick is a civil parish in the English county of Norfolk. The parish borders the River Thurne and Bastwick is at the south end of the bridge which carries the A149 road over that river to the village of Potter Heigham.

For the purposes of local government, the parish falls within the district of Great Yarmouth.

The church of Repps-with-Bastwick St Peter is one of 124 existing round-tower churches in Norfolk.

Toponymy 
The name 'Repps' is uncertain 'Strips of land' or perhaps, 'district/community'.

The name 'Bastwick' means 'Bast specialised farm'.

War Memorial
Repps-with-Bastwick's War Memorial is a stone cross located in St. Peter's Churchyard. It holds the following names for the First World War:
 Able-Seaman Edgar J. Mitchell (1886-1916), S.S. Zoroaster
 Lance-Corporal George S. Dack (1894-1918), 24th Battalion, Royal Fusiliers
 Deckhand Samuel Johnson (1885-1916), H.M. Trawler Cantatrice
 Engineman William R. King (1889-1916), H.M. Drifter Waveney II
 Gunner Albert G. Grimble (1892-1917), 217th Siege Battery, Royal Garrison Artillery
 Private Sidney C. Grimble (1897-1918), 18th Battalion, Lancashire Fusiliers
 Private Charles F. Dowe (1898-1916), Hawke Battalion, Royal Naval Division
 Private Charles J. Mitchell (1882-1916), 7th Battalion, Royal Norfolk Regiment
 Private Albert S. Dack (1899-1918), 1st Battalion, Queen's Own Royal West Kent Regiment

And, the following for the Second World War:
 Able-Seaman Frederick W. Blogg (d.1942), HMS Cornwall (56)
 Aircraftman Second-Class Frank J. Johnson (1921-1939), No. 99 Squadron RAF
 Fusilier George F. Dean (d.1944), 7th Battalion, Royal Northumberland Fusiliers
 Private Ralph S. Nichols (1922-1943), 6th Battalion, East Surrey Regiment

Notes 

http://kepn.nottingham.ac.uk/map/place/Norfolk/Repps%20with%20Bastwick

External links

 for Bastwick
 for Repps
St Peter's on the European Round Tower Churches website

Civil parishes in Norfolk
Borough of Great Yarmouth